Barsuki (Buro-Kale) is a rural locality (a selo) in Nazranovsky District of the Republic of Ingushetia, Russia. It forms the municipality of the rural settlement of Barsuki as the only settlement in its composition.

Geography 
On the eastern outskirts of the village are the federal highway "Kavkaz" and the railway line of the North Caucasian Railway (section  - ).

Etymology 
The Russian name of the settlement, according to some sources, goes back to the name of the officer Bortsak Malsagov. The Ingush name of the village "Буро́-Кӏале́" (also "БурокIалхе") is translated as "under the fortress" or "under the fortification".

History 

Barsuki was founded in 1836. Characteristics of the village (village Bursuka) as of 1874: "at the confluence of the Nazranovka River into the Sunzha river", 232 houses, 1161 residents (577 males and 584 females), Ingush (Sunni Muslims) live.

The village consisted of 492 households, 2472 people lived in it (1217 males and 1255 females). The settlement at the Nazran fortress included only 13 households, 121 people lived (69 males and 52 females). The village had 2 wells, a primary school, 14 small industrial enterprises (including 12 mills and 2 forges), a state sack point, and 2 party organizations. Also, one school of the first stage was located in the settlement at the Nazran fortress.

From 1944 to 1958, during the period of the deportation of Chechens and Ingush and the abolition of the Chechen-Ingush Autonomous Soviet Socialist Republic, the village was called Khordzhin (translated from Ossetian — "fruitful").

As of January 1, 1990, the village was the center of the Barsukinsky village council, which also included two small farms — Tibi-Khi and Blue Stone. In the village itself, on that date, 3002 people of the actual population lived.

In 1995, the village of Barsuki was abolished and included in the city of Nazran as one of the administrative districts. In 2009, on the basis of the abolished Barsukinsky administrative district, withdrawn from the city, the village of Barsuki was recreated and a municipal formation was formed on its basis with the status of a rural settlement as part of the Nazranovsky district.

Notable people 
  — statesman and military figure. Head of the Ingush militia in 1920–1932.
  — statesman. The first head of the Ingush Autonomous Oblast.
  (1907-1981) — military, public and economic figure, holder of five military orders, Hero of the Soviet Union (November 1943).
  — writer, translator, critic, journalist.
  (1942-2020) — circus rider, animal trainer, People's Artist of the RSFSR (1985).

References

Bibliography 
 
 
 

Rural localities in Ingushetia